CBVN may refer to:

 CBVN-FM, a radio retransmitter (101.5 FM) licensed to New Carlisle, Quebec, Canada, retransmitting CBVE-FM
 CBVN-TV, a television rebroadcaster (channel 45) licensed to New Carlisle, Quebec, Canada, rebroadcasting CBMT